Nicolas Delporte (born 1 January 1993) is a retired Belgian professional footballer, who last played as a wing-back for Oud-Heverlee Leuven in the Belgian First Division B.

References

External links
 Nicolas Delporte at worldfootball.net
 Nicolas Delporte at Soccerway
 Nicolas Delporte at Footballdatabase

1993 births
Living people
Belgian footballers
Association football defenders
Standard Liège players
K.A.A. Gent players
Oud-Heverlee Leuven players
Belgian Pro League players
Challenger Pro League players